California's 37th State Assembly district is one of 80 California State Assembly districts. It is currently represented by Democrat Steve Bennett of Ojai.

District profile 
The district encompasses the coast from Oxnard to Point Conception and serves as one of the northernmost points of Southern California. While most of the population is located in coastal cities and towns, the district also includes various communities in the Santa Ynez and the Santa Clara River Valleys.

Santa Barbara County – 53.4%
 Buellton
 Carpinteria
 Goleta
 Santa Barbara
 Solvang

Ventura County – 29.2%
 Fillmore
 Ojai
 Oxnard – 21.1%
 Santa Paula
 Ventura

Election results from statewide races

List of Assembly Members 
Due to redistricting, the 37th district has been moved around different parts of the state. The current iteration resulted from the 2011 redistricting by the California Citizens Redistricting Commission.

Election results 1992 - present

2020

2018

2016

2014

2012

2010

2008

2006

2004

2002

2000

1998

1996

1994

1992

See also 
 California State Assembly
 California State Assembly districts
 Districts in California

References

External links 
 District map from the California Citizens Redistricting Commission

37
Government of Santa Barbara County, California
Government of Ventura County, California
Carpinteria, California
Fillmore, California
Goleta, California
Ojai, California
Oxnard, California
Santa Barbara, California
Santa Paula, California
Santa Ynez Valley
Solvang, California
Ventura, California